Česlovas Kudaba (24 July 1934 – 19 February 1993) was a Lithuanian politician, geographer, born in Kobylnik, Poland. In 1990 he was among those who signed the Act of the Re-Establishment of the State of Lithuania.

References

1934 births
1993 deaths
People from Myadzyel District
People from Wilno Voivodeship (1926–1939)
Lithuanian politicians
Members of the Seimas
Vilnius University alumni
Academic staff of Vilnius University